Opsyra is a genus of moths of the family Noctuidae.

Species
 Opsyra chalcoela (Hampson, 1902)

References
Natural History Museum Lepidoptera genus database
Opsyra at funet

Hadeninae